"Get Me Home" is the first single from Foxy Brown's debut album Ill Na Na. The song features R&B male group Blackstreet. Produced by the production duo Trackmasters, it samples Eugene Wilde's 1984 single, "Gotta Get You Home Tonight".

The song reached number ten on the U.S. Billboard R&B charts. Directed by Hype Williams, the accompanying music video for the song premiered in November 1996, and was in heavy rotation on television music video channels.

Charts

Weekly charts

Year-end charts

References

1996 singles
Blackstreet songs
Foxy Brown (rapper) songs
Music videos directed by Hype Williams
Songs written by Jay-Z
1996 songs
Def Jam Recordings singles
Song recordings produced by Trackmasters
Songs written by Eugene Wilde